Boris Vladimirovich Annenkov (February 9, 1889 – April 25, 1927) was an  ataman of the Siberian Cossacks, major general and commander of the Seven Rivers Army. Due to numerous military crimes committed by his troops (against the Red, civilians, and even other White troops not under his command), he remains the most controversial personality in the White movement, and was despised even by his fellow White generals.

Biography 
Grandson of the Decembrist Ivan Alexandrovich Annenkov, Boris Vladimirovitch was born into the family of Vladimir Ivanovitch Annenkov, a retired colonel, and is part of the nobility of Volhynia.

Trained at the Odessa Cadet School and the Alexander Military School in Moscow, Boris Annenkov began his service with the 1st Siberian Cossack Regiment before moving to the 4th Siberian Cossack Regiment in Kokshetau. In 1914 a mutiny broke out in the regiment and Annenkov was appointed temporary commander by the mutineers. Sentenced to 1 year and 4 months' imprisonment, he did not serve his sentence but was sent to the front against the Germans.

For his combat valor he received between 1915 and 1917 a Golden Weapon for Bravery (known as Saint George Sword), as well as the Legion of Honor order from the hands of General Paul Pau.

After the 1917 revolutions Annenkov was sent back to Omsk with his men in December in order to dissolve the counter-revolutionary unit. Refusing to allow himself to be disarmed, he then began the fight against the Bolsheviks.

In March 1918 he was elected ataman of the Siberian Cossacks by a Cossack assembly whose legality is disputed. He fought the Red troops in the southern Urals and Central Asia and became the commander of the independent army of Seven Rivers in August 1919. During the winter of 1919-1920 he formally joined the forces of General Dutov; however, almost immediately, there was a conflict between him and Dutov due to atrocities committed by Annenkov troops, and Dutov refused to support him.

In the spring of 1920 Annenkov was forced to retreat towards the Chinese border. On April 28 he crossed the border with the rest of his men and settled in Ürümqi. The Chinese authorities arrested him in March 1921 and he was not released until three years later thanks to the efforts of General Denissov and the support of British and Japanese representatives.

On April 7, 1927, Annenkov was captured by Feng Yuxiang and delivered to the Chekists active in the region. Deported to the Soviet Union, he was shot as a war criminal on August 25, 1927, in Semipalatinsk along with Denissov.

In 1990s, his case was reviewed by the Russian General Prosecutor's Office, and he was refused rehabilitation.

Culture and media

Cinema and TV 

 1933 : Annenkovchtchina, film by Nikolaï Beresnev; the role of Annenkov was performed by Boris Livanov

References 

1889 births
1927 deaths
Chevaliers of the Légion d'honneur
Recipients of the Order of St. Anna, 4th class
Recipients of the Order of St. Anna, 3rd class
Recipients of the Order of St. Anna, 2nd class
Recipients of the Order of St. George of the Fourth Degree
White movement people
People executed by the Soviet Union by firearm
People of the Russian Civil War
People of the Russian Revolution
Russian military personnel of World War I
Russian people convicted of war crimes
Military history of Russia
Atamans
Annenkov family
Russian mass murderers
Executed mass murderers
People executed for war crimes